Chen Yongyan (Chinese: 陈永妍; born 1962) is a former Chinese gymnast.

Chen was born in Wuzhou, Guangxi Province. She competed at the 1984 Olympic Games and won a bronze medal in the Women's Team competition.

Chen is married to Li Ning, a prominent Chinese gymnast.

Competitive history

References

Chinese female artistic gymnasts
Olympic gymnasts of China
Gymnasts at the 1984 Summer Olympics
Olympic bronze medalists for China
Living people
Olympic medalists in gymnastics
1962 births
Gymnasts from Guangxi
People from Wuzhou
Asian Games medalists in gymnastics
Gymnasts at the 1982 Asian Games
Medalists at the 1984 Summer Olympics
Medalists at the World Artistic Gymnastics Championships
Asian Games gold medalists for China
Asian Games silver medalists for China
Medalists at the 1982 Asian Games
20th-century Chinese women